Jacksonia is a genus of true bugs belonging to the family Aphididae.

The species of this genus are found in Europe and Northern America.  The genus was first described by Frederick Vincent Theobald in 1923.

Species:
 Jacksonia gibbera Qiao, Xingyi Li, Bin Zhang & Xiaomei Su, 2013 
 Jacksonia papillata Theobald, 1923

References

Aphididae
Taxa described in 1923
Taxa named by Frederick Vincent Theobald